Kayak Island, (Eyak: Qe'yiłteh) which includes the Bering Expedition Landing Site, is located in the Gulf of Alaska,  SE of Cordova, Alaska Malaspina Coastal Plain, on the eastern edge of Chugach National Forest.

A brief visit by the Bering Expedition's German naturalist George Steller is among the first contributions to the West's knowledge of the natural and human history of the region.

The island was named "Kayak" in 1826 by Lt. Sarychev of the Russian Navy, because of the fancied resemblance of its outline to the Eskimo skin canoe.

Captain James Cook visited the island on May 12, 1778, and buried a bottle with a paper and two small pieces of silver given to him by Dr. Richard Kaye, the chaplain of King George III, for this purpose. Because of this, Capt. Cook gave the name  this feature. The 1779 expedition of Spanish explorer Ignacio de Arteaga y Bazán sighted the island about July 16, the feast day of Our Lady of Mt. Carmel (or Carmen), and so named it "Nuestra Senora del Carmen" or "Isla del Carmen."

The Bering Expedition Landing Site was declared a National Historic Landmark in 1978.

Cape Saint Elias is located on the southwest end of the island. Mount Saint Elias — about 115 miles to the ENE, and at 18,009 feet (5,489 m) the second highest mountain in both the United States and Canada — was likely named after this cape. The cape is also the site of Alaska's first confirmed tornado, which caused minor damage to the area on November 4, 1959. It was the 50th and last state to confirm their first tornado since 1950.

The Cape St. Elias Light is an important aid-to-navigation located on the island.

See also
List of National Historic Landmarks in Alaska
National Register of Historic Places listings in Chugach Census Area, Alaska

References

External links

Kayak Island: Block 1191, Census Tract 2, Valdez-Cordova Census Area, Alaska United States Census Bureau
 Amateur Radio Expedition Kayak Island NL6/VE7ACN

Islands of Alaska
Islands of Chugach Census Area, Alaska
Islands of Unorganized Borough, Alaska